Morteza Asadi (born February 24, 1979) is an Iranian football defender and coach.

Club career
Asadi played for Saba Battery F.C. in the 2006 AFC Champions League group stage. He joined Tractor Sazi in 2010. He was Tractor Sazi's captain. He joined Gostaresh on 5 July 2014.

Club career statistics
Last update: 7 August 2018

 Assist Goals

International career
Morteza Asadi made his debut for the senior national team in a friendly match against Belarus in February 2007. He was also called up to join the preliminary squad for the 2007 Asian Cup, but was not included in the final list.

Personal life
Morteza Asadi was born Tehran. He is originally from Ardabil. His nickname in Tabriz football is Türk Oğli.

Honours
Tractor Sazi
Iran Pro League runner-up (2): 2011–12, 2012–13
Hazfi Cup (1): 2013–14

References

1979 births
Living people
Iranian footballers
People from Tehran
Iran international footballers
Persian Gulf Pro League players
Azadegan League players
Saba players
Tractor S.C. players
Association football defenders
Gostaresh Foulad F.C. players
Sanat Naft Abadan F.C. players